Thomas Granville Brown (February 2, 1885 – November 4, 1950) was an American sport shooter who competed in the 1920 Summer Olympics.

In 1920, he won the silver medal as a member of the American squad in the team 300 metre military rifle, standing competition and the bronze medal in the team running deer, single shots event. In the 1920 Summer Olympics he also participated in the following events:

 Team running deer, double shots - fourth place
 running deer, double shots - place unknown
 running deer, single shots - place unknown

He was born in Halleck, West Virginia and died in Rawlins, Wyoming.

References

External links
Profile

1885 births
1950 deaths
American male sport shooters
ISSF rifle shooters
Running target shooters
Shooters at the 1920 Summer Olympics
Olympic silver medalists for the United States in shooting
Olympic bronze medalists for the United States in shooting
Medalists at the 1920 Summer Olympics
19th-century American people
20th-century American people